Coatomer subunit gamma is a protein that in humans is encoded by the COPG gene. It is one of seven proteins in the COPI coatomer complex that coats vesicles as they bud from the Golgi complex.

Interactions
COPG has been shown to interact with Dopamine receptor D1, COPZ1 and COPB1.

References

External links

Further reading